The 1956 All-Ireland Senior Camogie Championship Final was the 25th All-Ireland Final and the deciding match of the 1956 All-Ireland Senior Camogie Championship, an inter-county camogie tournament for the top teams in Ireland.

Antrim had ended Dublin's eight-year win streak and so were favourites to take the All-Ireland title. They led 4-3 to 4-2 near the end when Antrim's goalkeeper Teresa Kearns made a brilliant save, and the Glenswomen rushed down the field to score a fifth goal and secure victory.

References

All-Ireland Senior Camogie Championship Finals
Camogie
All-Ireland Senior Camogie Championship Final
All-Ireland Senior Camogie Championship Final
All-Ireland Senior Camogie Championship Final, 1956